Prototyla is a genus of moths of the family Crambidae.

Species
Prototyla alopecopa Meyrick, 1933
Prototyla haemoxantha Meyrick, 1935

References

Natural History Museum Lepidoptera genus database

Pyraustinae
Crambidae genera
Taxa named by Edward Meyrick